Koenigswarter is a surname, derived from the Bohemian town of Königswart. Members of the ennobled Königswarter family include:
 Baron Jules de Koenigswarter
 Baroness Nica de Koenigswarter, known as the "Jazz Baroness"
 Baron Louis de Koenigswarter

See also 
Palais Königswarter